The 2010 San Francisco 49ers season was the franchise's 65th season, their 61st in the National Football League, and the third year with Mike Singletary as the head coach. The 49ers were looking to build upon their 8–8 season in 2009.

The 49ers were expected by many to win the NFC West for the first time since 2002. However, the 49ers began the season with an 0–5 start and would end up with a losing record of 6–10 as they failed to reach the playoffs for the eighth consecutive season. The 49ers originally retained Jimmy Raye as the offensive coordinator, marking the first time since Greg Knapp in 2003 that the 49ers had the same offensive coordinator for more than one season. However, after starting the season with three straight losses, the 49ers fired Raye and promoted Quarterbacks coach Mike Johnson to offensive coordinator. Ultimately, head coach Singletary would himself be fired before the last game of the season.

Offseason

Coaching changes
The first major coaching change in the offseason was the firing of Al Everest as special teams coordinator. The 49ers interviewed several candidates and by mid-January settled on Kurt Schottenheimer as special-teams coordinator. One week later, another assistant coaching change was made when incumbent offensive line coach Chris Foerster was permitted to accept an offer to coach the same position with new Washington Redskins head coach Mike Shanahan. To replace Foerster, the 49ers immediately hired outgoing Seahawks offensive line coach Mike Solari, who had previously been an assistant line coach with the 49ers.

Roster changes

Free Agency

*RFA: Restricted free agent, UFA: Unrestricted free agent, ERFA: Exclusive rights free agent, Franchise: Franchise tag

Trades

2010 NFL Draft

After finishing the 2009 season with a record of 8–8, the 49ers held the 13th overall pick in the 2010 NFL Draft. They also obtained the 17th overall pick as a result of a trade in the 2009 NFL Draft that gave their second and fourth round picks in 2009 to the Carolina Panthers for the Panthers' first round pick in 2010. The 49ers traded their fifth round pick in 2010 to Miami for wide receiver Ted Ginn Jr. In the first round of the 2010 draft the 49ers moved up two picks by trading their #13 pick and 4th Round pick to the Denver Broncos to move up to pick #11, with which they selected offensive tackle Anthony Davis from Rutgers. Six picks later, the 49ers again chose to solidify their offensive line by selecting top-rated guard Mike Iupati out of Idaho.

Staff

Roster

Schedule

Preseason

Regular season

Standings

Regular season results

Week 1: at Seattle Seahawks

The 49ers began their season at Qwest Field for an NFC West match against the Seattle Seahawks.  In the first quarter, the Niners had the early lead when kicker Joe Nedney made a 23-yard field goal, which was extended in the second quarter when Nedney made another 23-yard field goal. Then, San Francisco failed to maintain it and then fell behind when Seahawks quarterback Matt Hasselbeck got a 1-yard touchdown run, followed by him making a 13-yard touchdown pass to wide receiver Deon Butler. In the third quarter, the 49ers struggled further when quarterback Alex Smith threw an interception to cornerback Marcus Trufant, which was returned 32 yards for a touchdown. This was followed by Hasselbeck's 3-yard touchdown pass to wide receiver Deion Branch. In the fourth quarter, the Niners continued to struggle when kicker Olindo Mare made a 35-yard field goal.

With the loss, the 49ers began their season at 0–1.

Week 2: vs. New Orleans Saints

Hoping to rebound from their divisional road loss to the Seahawks, the 49ers played their Week 2 home opener against the defending Super Bowl champion New Orleans Saints on Monday night.

San Francisco trailed early in the first quarter as center David Baas' high snap deep within Niner territory resulted in a safety.  The Saints would add onto their lead as quarterback Drew Brees completed a 6-yard touchdown pass to running back Reggie Bush.  The 49ers would respond in the second quarter with quarterback Alex Smith finding running back Frank Gore on a 12-yard touchdown pass.

The Niners would take the lead in the third quarter as rookie running back Anthony Dixon got a 2-yard touchdown run, but New Orleans would answer with Brees' 3-yard touchdown pass to tight end David Thomas.  In the fourth quarter, the Saints would add onto their lead as kicker Garrett Hartley got a 46-yard and a 19-yard field goal.  San Francisco would tie the game with Gore's 7-yard touchdown run, followed by Smith's 2-point conversion pass to tight end Vernon Davis.  However, New Orleans would get the last laugh as Hartley made the game-winning 37-yard field goal.

With the loss, the 49ers fell to 0–2.

Week 3: at Kansas City Chiefs

Looking for their first win, the 49ers flew to Arrowhead Stadium for an interconference duel with the Chiefs. Prior to the game, tight end Vernon Davis guaranteed victory. In the 2nd quarter, the 49ers trailed early as QB Matt Cassel completed a 31-yard TD pass to WR Dexter McCluster. The 49ers replied with kicker Joe Nedney hitting a 51-yard field goal. The 49ers fell further behind when Chiefs' kicker Ryan Succop hit a 32-yard field goal and then in the third quarter when Cassel found WR Dwayne Bowe and TE Tony Moeaki on 45 and 18-yard TD passes, respectively. RB Thomas Jones followed these scores with a 3-yard TD run. The 49ers narrowed the score when QB Alex Smith made a 12-yard TD pass to WR Josh Morgan.

With the loss, the 49ers fell to 0–3.

Week 4: at Atlanta Falcons

Still looking for a win the 49ers flew to Georgia Dome for an NFC duel with the Falcons. In the first quarter the 49ers took the early lead with QB Alex Smith making a 12-yard TD pass to TE Vernon Davis. Then DB Taylor Mays recovered a blocked punt in the endzone for a touchdown. Then the Falcons rallied with QB Matt Ryan completing an 8-yard TD pass to WR Harry Douglas. Then the Falcons took the lead with three field goals from kicker Matt Bryant. He made a 37-yard field goal near the end of the 2nd quarter, a 31-yard field goad in the 3rd.  Late in the 4th quarter, CB Nate Clements intercepted Matt Ryan's pass which should have sealed the game for the 49ers who were then up 14 – 13.  However, instead of going down, Clements continued down the left sideline attempting to score.  He would return the interception 39 yards before Falcons WR Roddy White was able to strip the ball from him and the Falcons recovered the fumble.  After regaining possession, the Falcons drove down the field again and this time was able to win the game on a 43-yard field goal by Matt Bryant, giving the 49ers another loss.

With the close loss, the 49ers fell to 0–4.

Week 5: vs. Philadelphia Eagles

Hoping to get their first win of the season, the 49ers went home for a Week 5 Sunday night duel with the Philadelphia Eagles.  The Niners delivered the game's opening strike in the first quarter as quarterback Alex Smith hooked up with wide receiver Michael Crabtree on a 7-yard touchdown pass, but the Eagles would answer with quarterback Kevin Kolb completing an 8-yard touchdown pass to tight end Brent Celek.  Philadelphia took the lead in the second quarter as kicker David Akers made a 33-yard field goal, followed by running back LeSean McCoy's 29-yard touchdown run.  Afterwards, San Francisco closed out the half with kicker Joe Nedney booting a 50-yard field goal.  After a scoreless third quarter, the Eagles would add onto their lead in the fourth quarter as safety Quintin Mikell returned a fumble 52 yards for a touchdown.  The Niners began to rally as Smith found tight end Vernon Davis on a 7-yard touchdown pass, yet Philadelphia answered with a 45-yard field goal from Akers.  San Francisco tried to rally as Smith found running back Frank Gore on a 1-yard touchdown pass, but Philadelphia's defense would hold on for the win.

With the loss, the 49ers fell to their first 0–5 start since 1979.

Week 6: vs. Oakland Raiders

Individual leaders

* Completions/Attempts
a Carries
b Long play
c Receptions
t Tackles
g Forced Fumble

Still looking for a win the 49ers played on home ground where they played their state rival, the Oakland Raiders. In the first quarter, the 49ers trailed early as kicker Sebastian Janikowski got a 27-yard field goal. Then he made a 24-yard field goal in the 2nd quarter. The 49ers replied with kicker Joe Nedney making a 25-yard field goal. They took the lead in the third quarter with QB Alex Smith making a 32-yard TD pass to WR Michael Crabtree. The Raiders cut the lead with Janikowski making a 40-yard field goal. The 49ers pulled away after Smith found TE Vernon Davis on a 17-yard TD pass.

With the win, the 49ers improve to 1–5.

Week 7: at Carolina Panthers

Coming off their win over the Raiders the 49ers flew to Bank of America Stadium for an NFC duel with the Panthers. In the first quarter the 49ers took the lead as QB Alex Smith got a 1-yard TD pass to TE Vernon Davis. The lead was cut when kicker John Kasay nailed a 47-yard field goal. The 49ers scored with kicker Joe Nedney making a 24-yard field goal. The Panthers tied the game with QB Matt Moore completing an 18-yard TD pass to WR David Gettis. The 49ers fell behind in the third quarter with Kasay booting a 55-yard field goal. They eventually got the lead back in the fourth quarter with Nedney hitting a 38-yard field goal, and with DE Ray McDonald returning an interception 31 yards for a touchdown. However, the Panthers tied the game with Moore finding Gettis again on a 23-yard TD pass. Following an interception by 49ers backup quarterback David Carr, Kasay successfully booted a 37-yard field goal to give the 49ers the loss.

With the loss, the 49ers fell to 1–6.

Week 8: vs. Denver Broncos (International Series)

The 49ers' 8th match was an Interconference duel with the Broncos at Wembley Stadium. In the first quarter the 49ers took the lead as kicker Joe Nedney got a 34-yard field goal. They soon trailed in the third quarter when QB Tim Tebow scrambled 1 yard for a touchdown; followed in the fourth quarter by kicker Matt Prater hitting a 32-yard field goal. They soon went on a scoring rally to take the lead with QB Troy Smith scrambling a yard for a touchdown, followed by his 28-yard TD pass to WR Michael Crabtree. Then RB Frank Gore got a 3-yard TD run to put the 49ers up 24–10. The lead was narrowed when QB Kyle Orton made a 1-yard TD pass to WR Brandon Lloyd (with a failed PAT).

With the win, the 49ers went into their bye week at 2–6.

Week 9: BYE

Week 10: vs. St. Louis Rams

The 49ers' ninth game was rivalry match against the Rams at home. In the first quarter the 49ers trailed early with kicker Josh Brown making a 42-yard field goal. They took the lead with RB Frank Gore getting a 1-yard TD run. This was followed in the second quarter by kicker Joe Nedney nailing a 26-yard field goal. The Rams fought back with QB Sam Bradford completing a 5-yard TD pass to WR Danny Amendola. Followed in the third quarter by RB Steven Jackson getting a 13-yard TD run. The 49ers got the lead back with Nedney getting a 47-yard field goal, followed by QB Troy Smith making a 16-yard TD pass to WR Michael Crabtree. The Rams tied the game with Brown making a 33-yard field goal. The decision was made at overtime when Nedney successfully put away a 29-yard field goal to give the 49ers their third win of the season, bringing their record up to 3–6.

Week 11: vs. Tampa Bay Buccaneers

Coming off their win over the Rams the 49ers played on home ground for an NFC duel with the Buccaneers. In the second quarter the 49ers trailed after RB Cadillac Williams made a 6-yard TD run. This was followed in the third quarter by QB Josh Freeman completing an 8-yard TD pass to WR Mike Williams; and in the fourth quarter by Freeman throwing a 1-yard TD pass to Donald Penn.

With the loss, the 49ers fell to 3–7.  This marked the 49ers' first shutout loss at home since 1977, when they were defeated by the Atlanta Falcons 7–0.

Week 12: at Arizona Cardinals

Hoping to rebound from their shutout loss to the Buccaneers, the 49ers flew to the University of Phoenix Stadium for a Week 12 NFC West duel with the Arizona Cardinals on Monday night.  San Francisco made the opening strike in the first quarter as quarterback Troy Smith found wide receiver Michael Crabtree on a 38-yard touchdown pass.  The Cardinals answered with kicker Jay Feely getting a 31-yard field goal, yet the 49ers responded with a 1-yard touchdown run from rookie running back Anthony Dixon.  San Francisco added onto their lead in the second quarter with an 8-yard touchdown pass from running back Brian Westbrook.  Arizona would hang on with Feely's 39-yard field goal.  Afterwards, the 49ers pulled away with a 38-yard field goal in the third quarter and a 26-yard field goal in the fourth quarter from kicker Shane Andrus.

With the win, San Francisco improved to 4–7.

Week 13: at Green Bay Packers

Coming off their win over the Cardinals the 49ers flew to Lambeau Field for an NFC duel with the Packers. The 49ers took the lead after kicker Jeff Reed hit a 44 and a 26-yard field goal. The lead didn't last long after QB Aaron Rodgers completed a 57-yard TD pass to WR Greg Jennings, followed by FB John Kuhn getting a 1-yard TD run. The 49ers cut the lead down with QB Troy Smith making a 66-yard TD pass to TE Vernon Davis, but in the third quarter, the Packers replied with Rodgers getting a 61-yard TD pass to WR Donald Driver. The 49ers scored again with Reed nailing a 23-yard field goal. They struggled further after Rodgers found Jennings again on a 1-yard TD pass. Followed in the fourth quarter by kicker Mason Crosby making a 43 and a 24-yard field goal.

With the loss, the 49ers fell to 4–8.

Week 14: vs. Seattle Seahawks

Hoping to rebound from their loss to the Packers the 49ers played on home ground for an NFC West rivalry match against the Seahawks. The 49ers took the lead first with QB Alex Smith completing a 42-yard TD pass to TE Vernon Davis, but the Seahawks replied with QB Matt Hasselbeck throwing an 11-yard TD pass to WR Ruvell Martin. The 49ers made a large scoring rally to increase their lead when kicker Jeff Reed hit a 33 and a 44-yard field goal, followed by Smith completing a 15 and a 62-yard TD pass to Josh Morgan and Brian Westbrook respectively. This was followed by Reed making a 22-yard field goal, and in the third quarter with FS Dashon Goldson returning an interception 39 yards for a touchdown. After that, Reed nailed a 36-yard field goal to put the 49ers up 40–7. The lead was broken down with RB Leon Washington returning the kickoff 92 yards for a touchdown, followed in the 4th quarter by QB Matt Hasselbeck getting a 2-yard TD pass to WR Deon Butler.

With the win, the 49ers improved to 5–8.

Week 15: at San Diego Chargers

Coming off their win over the Seahawks the 49ers played against the Chargers at Qualcomm Stadium on Thursday Night. The 49ers fell behind 2 minutes into the game with QB Philip Rivers throwing a 58-yard TD pass to WR Vincent Jackson, followed in the second quarter by kicker Nate Kaeding nailing a 25-yard field goal, then with Rivers finding Jackson on an 11-yard touchdown pass. In the third quarter the 49ers had a touchdown from the second-half kickoff return but was declined because of a face-masking penalty enforced on them. Following that, they struggled further with FB Mike Tolbert getting a 1-yard TD run, followed by Rivers connecting to Jackson on a 48-yard TD pass, then with Kaeding hitting a 39-yard field goal. The 49ers made their only score of the game with RB Brian Westbrook getting a 1-yard TD run. Justin Smith was ejected from the game after shoving a referee.

With the loss, the 49ers fell to 5–9.

Week 16: at St. Louis Rams

The 49ers' fifteenth game was an NFC West rivalry rematch against the Rams at Edward Jones Dome. The 49ers struggled in the first quarter when Steven Jackson got a 1-yard TD run, followed by QB Troy Smith getting sacked in the endzone by DE James Hall for a safety. They got back in the game after Ted Ginn Jr. returned a punt 78 yards for a touchdown, but fell further behind after kicker Josh Brown nailed a 43-yard field goal. They took the lead with Smith completing a 60-yard TD pass to WR Michael Crabtree, but fell behind again as Brown got a 30-yard field goal, followed by QB Sam Bradford throwing a 3-yard TD pass to WR Laurent Robinson. The 49ers tried to cut this lead with kicker Jeff Reed making a 47-yard field goal, but the Rams pulled away with Brown hitting a 28-yard field goal.

With the loss, the 49ers fell to 5–10, eliminating them from post-season contention for the eighth consecutive season. As a result of this and a sideline argument during the game, Singletary was fired as head coach later that night.

Week 17: vs. Arizona Cardinals

The 49ers' final game was an NFC West rematch against the Cardinals.  The 49ers took the lead as QB Alex Smith completed a 37-yard TD pass to WR Ted Ginn Jr., followed in the 2nd quarter by kicker Jeff Reed making a 39-yard field goal. The Cardinals narrowed the lead as QB John Skelton completed a 10-yard TD pass to WR Larry Fitzgerald, but the 49ers extended their lead after Smith completed a 59-yard TD pass to TE Vernon Davis, followed by RB Brian Westbrook running 6 yards to the endzone for a touchdown twice in succession. This was followed by CB Tarell Brown returning an interception 62 yards for a touchdown.

With the win, the 49ers finish with a 6–10 record.

References

External links

 
 49ers official web site

San Francisco 49ers
San Francisco 49ers seasons
2010 in San Francisco
San